Zero seek is a mechanical engineering design component of most computer-controlled data storage devices, including floppy disk drives, tape drives, and early hard drives.

Most early data storage devices were controlled primarily by stepper motors, which are able to move in very small, precise rotational movements. These movements were commonly used to define separate physical spaces where data is to be stored, such as the rotations being used to move a read/write head across the surface of a recording media to define tracks of cylinders of data on the media.

Although the movement of the stepper is precise, when a device is first powered on, the computer usually cannot immediately determine where the stepper is positioned. It needs to do something in order to calibrate the movement of the stepper so that it can know where the stepper is positioned.
The most common method of stepper synchronization is the zero seek, which is to move the stepper until it is able to find track zero. Once track zero has been located, that position is then used to locate all other positions, by continuously staying aware of the number steps the stepper motor has taken.

In the event of a severe data error when either reading or writing, it is possible that there has been a synchronization failure and the computer has lost track of the correct position of the stepper. The computer will then perform a zero seek in order to realign the stepper on track zero and get it back in alignment, just in case that was the cause of the problem.

Zero seeking takes two primary forms: the hard end-stop and the sensed end-stop.

A hard end-stop is often nothing more than a physical barrier against which the stepper mechanism collides and cannot move further. Hard end-stops can be quite noisy because the stepper will usually attempt to advance as far as it ever possibly would normally advance, whether the end-stop is nearby or far away. If nearby, the mechanism collides with the end-stop and continues to attempt to move against it, causing considerable noise and vibration. In some cases the end-stop can go out of alignment after much of this pounding abuse by the synchronization process.

A sensed end-stop uses some sort of electronic sensor to determine when the mechanism has reached track zero. The most common form of sensor is the light-beam sensor, using a light-emitting diode and a photosensor. An opaque blade attached to the mechanism cuts the lightbeam just as the mechanism reaches track zero, signalling that the mechanism has arrived and is in alignment. Sensed end-stops are silent because movement of the mechanism stops immediately after track zero has been found.

Mechanical engineering